The 24th government of Turkey (30 May 1960 – 5 January 1961) was a government in the history of Turkey. It is also called the first Gürsel government.

Background 
After the 1960 Turkish coup d'état, the coup leader Cemal Gürsel formed a technocratic government.

The government
In the list below, the  cabinet members who served only a part of the cabinet's lifespan are shown in the column "Notes".

Aftermath
By the beginning of 1961, the constituent assembly was formed. Cemal Gürsel resigned to form a new cabinet that would cooperate with the constituent assembly.

References

Cabinets of Turkey
1960 establishments in Turkey
1961 disestablishments in Turkey
Cabinets established in 1960
Cabinets disestablished in 1961
Members of the 24th government of Turkey